William Newman (24 November 1946 – 12 October 2022) was an Irish footballer who played as a midfielder in the League of Ireland during the 1960s and 1970s.

Newman played for the amateur Bohemians alongside the likes of Billy Young and Tommy Kelly before turning professional and signing for Shelbourne.
 
While at Shelbourne, he made his solitary appearance for the Republic of Ireland national team on 27 May 1969 in a 2–0 defeat to Denmark in place of Johnny Giles. Newman was also briefly player-manager of Tonbridge in 1971, replacing fellow Irishman Joe Carolan in the role.

Newman died on 12 October 2022, at the age of 75.

References

1946 births
2022 deaths
Republic of Ireland association footballers
Association football midfielders
Republic of Ireland international footballers
League of Ireland players
Home Farm F.C. players
Bohemian F.C. players
Shelbourne F.C. players
Association footballers from Dublin (city)